Plextor (styled PLEXTOR) is a Taiwanese (formerly Japanese) consumer electronics brand, best known for solid-state drives and optical disc drives.

Company
The brand name Plextor was used for all products manufactured by the Electronic Equipment Division and Printing Equipment Division of the Japanese company Plextor Inc., which was a 100%-owned subsidiary company of Shinano Kenshi Corp., also a Japanese company. The brand was formerly known as TEXEL, under which name it introduced its first CD-ROM optical disc drive in 1989. The brand has been used for flash memory products, Blu-ray players and burners, DVD-ROM burners, CD-ROM burners, DVD and CD media, network hard disks, portable hard disks, digital video recorders, and floppy disk drives.

The brand Plextor was in 2010 licensed to Philips & Lite-On Digital Solutions Corporation, a subsidiary company of Lite-On Technology Corporation. Therefore, all the Plextor products since then, especially SSDs, are of a Taiwanese, not a Japanese brand. However, the Japanese company Plextor Inc., who originated this brand name, continues, and sells new products under other brands such as PLEXLOGGER and PLEXTALK.

Products

In an effort to strengthen its storage leader position, Plextor introduced its first-ever solid state drives, the M1 SSD series available in 64 GB and 128 GB capacities. Soon after its M1 release, Plextor released the M2 Series 128 GB, and 256 GB, available in 64, using SATA 6 Gbit/s interface, which they claimed to be the first SATA 3 SSD available at the time.

In October 2011, Plextor announced the limited edition M2P Series which boast significant increase in speed performance from its M2 Series. Notably, Plextor introduced "ironclad" five-year warranty for its SSD, making them one of the few manufacturers to do so. In addition to the five-year warranty, Plextor introduced its exclusive TrueSpeed Technology with the M2P series. True Speed Technology is designed to maintain high speed in the real-world computing environment. It consistently works to maintain original performance levels in the long term and without the severe write speed degradation that can occur with other SSDs.

In December 2011 and January 2012, Plextor released the M3 and M3 Pro Series in 64 GB, 128 GB, 256 GB, and 512 GB capacities. Similar to its predecessor, the M3 is a SATA 6 Gbit/s interface with a Marvell chip set. New, is the 24 nm Toggle NAND Flash (instead of 32 nm Toggle NAND Flash used for the M1, M2, and M2P). The sequential read-write speed of the M3 Series max at 540/450 MB/s while the random read-write speed max out at 75,000/69,000.

Optical drives 

Plextor optical drives are known for having an extended functionality and command set for power users, that has not been adapted by other optical drive vendors.

This functionality includes extended surface error scanning, GigaRec (higher density recording on CDs, similar to the DDCD "Purple Book" standard), VariRec (laser power calibration), and "Silent Mode", which has the ability to adjust the ejection and loading speed of the disc tray and to limit the rotation speed of the disc.

External links

References

Computer storage companies
Electronics companies of Japan
Electronics companies of Taiwan
Japanese brands
Taiwanese brands
Computer companies established in 1985
1985 establishments in Taiwan
Optical computer storage